|}

Oisin Murphy (born 6 September 1995) is an Irish jockey based in the United Kingdom who competes in flat racing. He has won a British Classic and a number of Group 1 races. He was British Champion Jockey in 2019,  2020 and 2021.

Early life
Murphy grew up in Killarney, County Kerry. A premature baby, he weighed just 2 lb 14 oz (1.3 kg) at birth. He started riding aged four and got his own pony, Rusty, when he was seven. When he was fourteen, the family moved to Buttevant, County Cork, so that Murphy could ride under the tutelage of his uncle Jim Culloty, three-time Cheltenham Gold Cup winner and Grand National winner. Having sat on a racehorse for the first time at the age of fourteen, Murphy abandoned his earlier ambition to be a show-jumper and embarked on the pony-racing circuit. When he was fifteen, he spent the summer at Tommy Stack's yard in County Tipperary and the following summer worked at Ballydoyle. In October 2012, at the age of seventeen, he moved to England and joined Andrew Balding's yard at Kingsclere in Berkshire.

Career

Murphy made an instant impact in his first year as a professional jockey in 2013, riding a four-timer at Scottish Racing’s Ayr Gold Cup day in September, including the Ayr Gold Cup itself on Highland Colori, before going on to ride a winter in Australia, mainly for Danny O'Brien and gaining a total of 13 winners. In an interview in 2019, Murphy recalled his early days in racing and spoke of his admiration for older jockeys such as Kieren Fallon as well as contemporaries like Silvestre De Sousa and Jim Crowley, with his idol being Frankie Dettori after whom he named his dog and whom he credits as being the best jockey he has raced against. Murphy conceded that he was "probably a little cheeky" in the past and said that he took a few punches from older jockeys in the weighing room. He credited Dettori with having been supportive as his career as a young jockey progressed. 

He gained his first Group success when partnering Hot Streak to victory in the Group 2 Temple Stakes at Haydock in May 2014 and went on to be crowned British Flat Racing Champion Apprentice later that year. A second Group 2 came in the German 2,000 Guineas on Karpino in May 2015, followed by his biggest prize up until that point - the Ebor Handicap on Litigant in August. 

In 2016, he became number one jockey to Qatar Racing and won 10 Group races on 10 different horses, including Lightning Spear (Celebration Mile) and Simple Verse (Park Hill Stakes).

In 2017 Benbatl, trained by Saeed bin Suroor, provided Murphy with his first Royal Ascot victory when he won the Group 3 Hampton Court Stakes. Murphy gained his first Group 1 victory at the 2017 Prix de l’Arc de Triomphe meeting aboard the Martyn Meade-trained Aclaim in the Prix de la Foret. This was followed by a Group 1 success in Canada when the Balding-trained Blond Me won the E.P. Taylor Stakes. The following year, Murphy won a further nine Group 1 races, in five countries. Victories were provided by: Roaring Lion in the Coral-Eclipse, Juddmonte International Stakes, Irish Champion Stakes and Queen Elizabeth II Stakes; Benbatl in the Dubai Turf and the Bayerisches Zuchtrennen; Lightning Spear in the Sussex Stakes; The Tin Man in the Haydock Sprint Cup; and Royal Marine in the Prix Jean-Luc Lagardère.

There were four more Group 1 wins for Murphy in 2019, in Great Britain (on Deirdre in the Nassau Stakes, Veracious in the Falmouth Stakes and Kameko in the Vertem Futurity Trophy) and in Japan (on Suave Richard in the Japan Cup). In June 2019, Murphy tested positive for alcohol in a breath test. Although he was under the legal drink-driving limit, this was over the limit for race riding and he had to miss a day's racing at Salisbury. The incident affected his racing, and he dropped behind in the jockeys' championship, having been 12 wins ahead. However, he caught up and in October became the British Champion Jockey.  

Murphy achieved his first British Classic win in June 2020, when Kameko won the postponed 2000 Guineas. He retained his champion jockey title in the abbreviated 2020 season, winning 142 races, 9 ahead of his closest rival, William Buick. Wins included the Cheveley Park Stakes on Alcohol Free and the Haydock Sprint Cup on Dream of Dreams. In November 2020 Murphy received a three-month ban for having tested positive for cocaine at a meeting in France in July. France Galop, the French governing body of racing, accepted Murphy's explanation that he had never taken cocaine himself but had tested positive through environmental contamination, having had sex the day before with a woman who was an occasional cocaine user.

Murphy returned from the ban for another successful season in 2021. He resumed his partnership with Alcohol Free, winning the Coronation Stakes and the Sussex Stakes. On 3 October 2021 he gained another Group 1 victory when he won the Prix Marcel Boussac at Longchamp on Zellie, trained by André Fabre, a few days after a parade ring incident at Salisbury, when he was thrown by an unraced two-year-old, had left him needing stitches in his lip. On 8 October he was stood down from his rides at Newmarket after failing a breath test, having been involved in a fracas in a Newmarket pub the previous evening. On 9 October he won the Cesarewitch Handicap on the Nicky Henderson trained Buzz. Murphy finished the 2021 season on 153 wins, two ahead of rival William Buick, and was crowned champion flat jockey for a third successive season on Champions Day at Ascot.

On 16 December 2021 it emerged that Murphy was facing disciplinary charges brought by the British Horseracing Authority (BHA) for a breach of Covid-19 travel protocols in 2020 and two failed breath tests in 2021. He announced that he had temporarily relinquished his licence. Murphy faced a disciplinary panel of the BHA on 22 February 2022. He admitted breaching coronavirus protocols, misleading the BHA and acting in a way that prejudiced the reputation of horseracing, as well as two alcohol breaches. He was banned until February 2023.

Personal life

Murphy is an ambassador for the QIPCO British Champions Series and between December 2014 and November 2020 wrote regular blogs for their website. He speaks Irish, English, French and German.

Major wins 

 Great Britain
 2000 Guineas - (1) Kameko (2020)
 Cheveley Park Stakes - (1) Alcohol Free (2020)
 Coronation Stakes - (1) Alcohol Free (2021)
 Eclipse Stakes - (1) Roaring Lion (2018)
 Falmouth Stakes - (1) Veracious (2019)
 Haydock Sprint Cup - (2) The Tin Man (2018), Dream of Dreams (2020)
 International Stakes - (1) Roaring Lion (2018)
 Nassau Stakes - (1) Deirdre (2019)
 Queen Elizabeth II Stakes - (1) Roaring Lion (2018)
 Sussex Stakes - (2) Lightning Spear (2018), Alcohol Free (2021)
 Vertem Futurity Trophy - (1) Kameko (2019)

 Ireland
 Irish Champion Stakes - (1) Roaring Lion (2018)

 France
 Prix de la Foret - (1) Aclaim (2017)
 Prix Jean-Luc Lagardère - (1) Royal Marine (2018)
 Prix Marcel Boussac - (1) Zellie (2021)

 Canada
 E. P. Taylor Stakes - (1) Blond Me (2017)

 Germany
 Bayerisches Zuchtrennen - (1) Benbatl (2018)

 United Arab Emirates
 Dubai Turf - (1) Benbatl (2018)

 Japan
 Japan Cup - (1) Suave Richard (2019)

 United States 
 Breeders' Cup Distaff - (1) Marche Lorraine (2021)

References

External links 

1995 births
Living people
Irish jockeys
Irish male equestrians
Lester Award winners
British Champion flat jockeys
British Champion apprentice jockeys
People from Killarney
People from Kingsclere